House at 218 Dearborn Street is a historic home located in the Black Rock neighborhood of Buffalo in Erie County, New York. It was built about 1880, and is a one-story, wood-frame shotgun-style workers cottage on a limestone foundation.  It is three bays wide and has a low pitched gable roof.  It features a hipped roof front porch with decorative spandrels, added about 1890.  Also on the property is a shed dated to about 1890.

It was listed on the National Register of Historic Places in 2011.

References

External links
Buffalo as an Architectural Museum: House at 218 Dearborn Street

Houses on the National Register of Historic Places in New York (state)
Houses completed in 1880
Houses in Buffalo, New York
National Register of Historic Places in Buffalo, New York